Arthur John Leonard Williams (17 December 1888 – 30 September 1968) was an Australian politician and a member of the New South Wales Legislative Assembly  from  1940 until  1956. He was a member of the Labor Party (ALP).

Williams was born in Paddington, New South Wales and was the son of a hotel broker. He was  educated at the Marist Brothers' School, Paddington and qualified as an accountant, opening his own accountancy company and specialising in the auditing of trade unions. Williams was elected to the parliament as the Labor member for Ryde at the 1940 by-election caused by the resignation of the United Australia Party member, Eric Spooner who successfully contested the seat of Robertson at the 1940 federal election. He defeated the UAP candidate by 220 votes. At the 1941 election, following an unfavourable redistribution Williams chose to contest the safer seat of Georges River. He defeated the sitting UAP member Cecil Monro and held the seat until the 1953 election when, after a further redistribution, he successfully contested the new seat of East Hills.  Williams  retired from public life at the next election in 1956. He did not hold party, parliamentary or ministerial office.

References

 

1888 births
1968 deaths
Members of the New South Wales Legislative Assembly
Australian Labor Party members of the Parliament of New South Wales
20th-century Australian politicians